Karikuzhi is a place in Kollam district of Kerala, India. Nearby places are Perayam, Kumbalam, Padappakkara and Kanjiracodu. Karmala Rani Parish Church has been recently renovated. Karikuzhi, Mulavana Pin code is 691503 and the postal head office is Mulavana.

Demographics 
Malayalam is the Local Language here.

Religion 
Christianity is the main religion in Karikuzhi.

Geographical Features 
It is on the bank of the Ashtamudi Lake.

References

Villages in Kollam district